Priit Raik (9 July 1948 Väike-Maarja – 27 January 2008 Tartu) was an Estonian composer, conductor and pedagogue.

In 1968, he graduated from the Heino Eller Tartu Music College. In 1973 he graduated from Tallinn State Conservatory in conducting specialty. 1982-1990 he taught conducting at Tallinn State Conservatory.

His conducting career started in 1970s, when (1973-1982) he conducted a military orchestra. 1984-1984 he conducted the Tallinn State Conservatory's orchestras. Since 1990 he worked in Finland.

Awards:
 1988: Estonian SSR merited artistic personnel

Works

Works for the choir
 "Õnne algus" - text: L. Ruud
 "Valged hiired" - text: H. Muller
 "Õismäe valss" - text: L. Tungal
 "Mulgi laul" - text: K. Kass
 "Pääsusilmad" - text: V. Kollin

References

1948 births
2008 deaths
Estonian composers
20th-century Estonian composers
21st-century Estonian composers
Estonian conductors (music)
Estonian Academy of Music and Theatre alumni
People from Väike-Maarja